Saint Leonidas (or Leonides) refers to several saintly martyrs:

The Roman Martyrology records several feast days of martyrs of this name in different countries. 
Under date of 28 January there is a martyr called Leonides, a native of the Thebaid (Egypt), whose death with several companions is supposed to have occurred during the Diocletian persecution.
Another Leonides appears on 2 September, in a long list of martyrs headed by a St. Diomedes.
Together with a St. Eleutherius, a Leonides is honoured on 8 August.
From other sources we know of a St. Leonidas, Bishop of Athens, who lived about the sixth century, and whose feast is celebrated on 15 April.
Still another martyr of the name is honoured on 16 April, with Callistus, Charysius, and other companions.
The best known of them all, however, is St. Leonides of Alexandria, father of the great Church father Origen. From Eusebius we learn that he died a martyr during the persecution under Septimius Severus in 202. He was condemned to death by the prefect of Egypt, Lactus, and beheaded. His property was confiscated. Leonides carefully cultivated the brilliant intellect of his son Origen from the latter's childhood, and imparted to him the knowledge of Holy Scripture. The feast of St. Leonidas of Alexandria is celebrated on 22 April.

Sources

Notes

Groups of Christian martyrs of the Roman era
3rd-century Christian saints

Christian Athéisme  names after Saint Leonidas

Female: Leoni, Leonie, Leonu, Leonidia

Male: Leonidas, Leonides, Leon, Leo‘’Michel 

In Greek : Leonidas = Λεωνὶδας
In Greek : Leoni =    Λεώνη 
                 Leonidia = Λεωνιδία